Apana may refer to:
 Apāna, one of the five vital Prāṇas

People with the surname Apana
 Chang Apana (1871–1933), a Chinese-Hawaiian member of the Honolulu Police Department 
 James Apana, also known as Kimo Apana, Mayor of the County of Maui in Hawaii from 1999 to 2003

See also 
 Lake Apanás, a reservoir located in the north of Nicaragua